The Ethiopian Free Press Journalists' Association (EFJA) is a non-profit, non-governmental organization that seeks to organize Ethiopian journalists and protect press freedoms in Ethiopia.

EFJA is a member of the International Freedom of Expression Exchange, a global network of more than 70 non-governmental organisations that monitors free expression violations around the world and defends journalists, writers and others who are persecuted for exercising their right to freedom of expression.

Ethiopian journalists
International Federation of Journalists
Journalism-related professional associations